This is an index of Vatican City–related topics.

0-9
00120 (Vatican postcode)

A
Acta Apostolicae Sedis
Angels Unawares
Anima Mundi museum
Annates
Anthem
Apostolic Nunciature
Apostolic Palace
Architecture of Vatican City
Archives
Association of Vatican Lay Workers

B
Basilica di Santa Maria Maggiore 
Bibliotheca Palatina
Bishop of Rome
Borgia Apartments
Bramante Staircase

C
Capital punishment in Vatican City
Cappella Giulia
Cappella Paolina
Cardinal Secretary of State
Casina Pio IV
Christianity
Circus of Nero
Coats of arms of the Holy See and Vatican City
Collection of Modern Religious Art
College of Cardinals
Corps of Firefighters of the Vatican City State
Corps of Gendarmerie of Vatican City
Cortile del Belvedere
Crime in Vatican City

D
Domus Sanctae Marthae
Door of the Dead in St. Peter's Basilica

E
Economy of Vatican City

F
Flag of the Vatican City
Foreign relations of the Holy See
Fountains of St. Peter's Square
Fundamental Law of Vatican City State

G
Gallery of Maps
Gallery of Sistine Chapel ceiling
Gardens of Vatican City 
Geography of Vatican City
Governor of Vatican City
Gregorian Tower

H
History of the Catholic Church since 1962
History of the Papacy
Holy See
Holy See–Israel relations
Holy See–Italy relations
Holy See–Palestine relations
Holy See Press Office

I

J

K

L
L'Osservatore Romano (Vatican City newspaper)
L'Osservatore della Domenica
Languages of Vatican City
Lateran Basilica
Lateran Palace
Lateran Treaty
Law of Vatican City
Legal status of the Holy See
Leonine City
LGBT rights in Vatican City
List of diplomatic missions of the Holy See
List of newspapers in Vatican City

M
Mater Ecclesiae (monastery)
Military of Vatican City
Monument to the Royal Stuarts
Music of Vatican City

N
National Anthem of Vatican City
Niccoline Chapel
Noble Guard

O
Octava Dies
Old St. Peter's Basilica
Outline of Vatican City

P
Palace of the Holy Office
Palazzi Pontifici
Papal Apartments
Papal Concert to Commemorate the Shoah
Papal conclave (Papal elections)
Papal coronation
Papal Gentleman
Papal household
Papal States
Papal tiara
Papal tombs
Papal tombs in Old St. Peter's Basilica
Passetto di Borgo
Paul VI Audience Hall
Pauline Chapel
Pietà (Michelangelo)
Pius Wars
Politics of Vatican City
Pontifical Academy of Sciences
Pontifical Academy of Social Sciences
Pontifical Commission
Pontifical Commission for Vatican City State
Pontifical Swiss Guard
Pope
Pope Benedict XVI
Pope Francis
Popemobile
Population of Vatican City
Porta San Pellegrino
Postage stamps and postal history of Vatican City
Prefecture of the Pontifical Household
Presidents of the Pontifical Commission
Prisoner in the Vatican
Properties of the Holy See
Public holidays in Vatican City

Q

R
Rail transport in Vatican City
Raphael Rooms
Redemptoris Mater Chapel
Restoration of the Sistine Chapel frescoes
Roman Catholic Church
Roman Curia
Roman Historical Institutes
Room of Tears

S
St. Peter's Baldachin
Saint Peter's Basilica
Saint Peter's chair
Saint Peter's Square
St. Peter's Square Fountains
Saint Peter's tomb
Sala Regia
San Pellegrino in Vaticano
Sant'Anna dei Palafrenieri
Santa Maria della Pietà in Camposanto dei Teutonici
Saints Martin and Sebastian of the Swiss
Santo Stefano degli Abissini
Santo Stefano degli Ungheresi
Savoyard Era
Scala Regia
Secretariat for Communications
Secretariat for the Economy
Secretariat of State
Sistine Chapel
Sistine Chapel ceiling
Sistine Chapel Choir
Swiss Guard

T
Telephone numbers in Vatican City
Teutonic Cemetery
The Last Judgment by Michelangelo
The Resurrection sculpture
The Story of the Vatican, 1941 documentary
Tomb of the Julii
Torre San Giovanni
Tourism in Vatican City
Transport in Vatican City

U
 Universi Dominici Gregis

V
.va (Vatican City internet sites)
Vatican Advanced Technology Telescope
Vatican Bank
Vatican Christmas Tree
Vatican City
Vatican City Championship
Vatican City culture
Vatican City during World War II
Vatican City football team
Vatican Climate Forest
Vatican Constitution
Vatican Cricket Team
Vatican euro coins
Vatican Heliport
Vatican Hill
Vatican Historical Museum
Vatican Information Service
Vatican leaks scandal
Vatican Library
Vatican lira
Vatican Museums
Vatican Necropolis
Vatican Observatory
Vatican Pharmacy
Vatican Publishing House
Vatican Radio
Vatican Radio lawsuit
Vatican Secret Archives
Vatican Television Center
Via della Conciliazione
Vicar General

W
Women in Vatican City
World Heritage Sites in Southern Europe (The Vatican itself is one such site)

X

Y

Z

See also

Index of Catholic Church articles
Lists of country-related topics - similar lists for other countries

Vatican City